Rubén Jurado Fernández (born 25 April 1986 in Seville, Andalusia) is a Spanish footballer who plays for Recreativo de Huelva as a striker.

Honours
Piast Gliwice
I liga: 2011–12

Arka Gdynia
Polish Super Cup: 2017

AEL
Cypriot Cup: 2018–19

References

External links

1986 births
Living people
Spanish footballers
Footballers from Seville
Association football forwards
Segunda División B players
Tercera División players
Tercera Federación players
CD Utrera players
Sevilla Atlético players
CP Cacereño players
UD Almansa players
CD Atlético Baleares footballers
Barakaldo CF footballers
UD Poblense players
Xerez CD footballers
Recreativo de Huelva players
Ekstraklasa players
I liga players
Piast Gliwice players
Arka Gdynia players
Liga I players
ASA 2013 Târgu Mureș players
Cypriot First Division players
AEL Limassol players
Spanish expatriate footballers
Expatriate footballers in Poland
Expatriate footballers in Romania
Expatriate footballers in Cyprus
Spanish expatriate sportspeople in Poland
Spanish expatriate sportspeople in Romania
Spanish expatriate sportspeople in Cyprus